Frederic de Forest Allen (1844–1897) was an American classical scholar.

Early life
Frederick Forest Allen was born in 1844 in Oberlin, Ohio. He graduated at Oberlin College in 1863.

Allen taught Greek and Latin at the University of Tennessee from 1866 to 1868.  He attended the University of Leipzig in Germany from 1868 to 1870, where his thesis supervisor was Georg Curtius.  He earned his Ph.D. there with his thesis De Dialecto Locrensium.

Career
Allen was Professor of Foreign Languages at the University of Cincinnati, and at Yale College. He held the chair of classical philology at Harvard for the last seventeen years of his life.

Death
He died in 1897 in Cambridge, Massachusetts.

Bibliography
 Remnants of Early Latin, (1880)  
 A revision of Hadley's Greek Grammar, (second edition, 1886)  
 Greek Versification in Inscriptions (1888)  
 Æschylus: The Prometheus Bound and the Fragments of the Prometheus Unbound (1897)

External sources

References

1844 births
1897 deaths
American philologists
American classical scholars
American non-fiction writers
Oberlin College alumni
University of Tennessee faculty
University of Cincinnati faculty
Classical scholars of Yale University
People from Oberlin, Ohio
Classical scholars of Harvard University
Leipzig University alumni
Classical philologists
Scholars of ancient Greek literature
Western Reserve Academy alumni